Sergio Akieme Rodríguez (born 16 December 1997) is a Spanish professional footballer who plays as a left-back for La Liga club Almería. Born in Spain, he holds Equatoguinean citizenship.

Club career

Rayo Vallecano
Akieme was born in Madrid through Equatoguinean parents – his father was born in Bata while his mother was born in Malabo. He joined Rayo Vallecano's youth setup in August 2013 at the age of 15, from Getafe.

Akieme made his senior debut with the reserves on 30 August 2015, starting in a 1–1 Tercera División away draw against Navalcarnero. On 30 December he was included in Paco Jémez's first team call up for a La Liga match against Atlético Madrid, but remained an unused substitute in the 0–2 home loss the following day.

Akieme made his professional debut on 6 September 2016, starting in a 2–0 Copa del Rey away win against Almería. He made his Segunda División debut the following 9 June, coming on as a second-half substitute for Lass Bangoura in a 2–1 away win against Sevilla B.

Barcelona
On 2 September 2019, Akieme signed a two-year deal with Barcelona, being initially assigned to the reserves in Segunda División B. Akieme has made a bright start to his career with Barcelona B, registering 4 assists in 23 games from left back. On the 22 February he was named in the squad to play against Eibar, due to an injury of first choice left back Jordi Alba.

Loan and permanent transfer to Almería
On 19 September 2020, Akieme joined Almería in the second division on a year-long loan with an obligation to buy him for €3.5 million if he plays 22 games.

On 7 July 2021, Almería executed their option to buy Akieme permanently for €3.5 million. Barça reserve 10% of any future sale and also the right to first refusal.

Career statistics

Honours
Rayo Vallecano
Segunda División: 2017–18

References

External links

1997 births
Living people
Citizens of Equatorial Guinea through descent
Spanish sportspeople of Equatoguinean descent
Spanish footballers
Footballers from Madrid
Equatoguinean footballers
Association football fullbacks
La Liga players
Segunda División players
Segunda División B players
Tercera División players
Rayo Vallecano B players
Rayo Vallecano players
FC Barcelona Atlètic players
UD Almería players
Spain youth international footballers